The MV Chimacum is the third vessel of the  auto ferries for the Washington State Ferries system. The ship was built by Vigor Industrial at their shipyard in Seattle, Washington and entered service on the Seattle–Bremerton route in 2017.

Description and design

The  auto ferries, also known as the 144 Car Ferries, are based on the Issaquah design.

Ferries of the Olympic class are powered by two Electro-Motive Diesel (EMD) two-stroke 12-710G7C diesel engines, each mounted at either end of the ferry turning a propeller at each end of the ship creating  total. The Olympic-class ferries were designed with two car decks, a sun deck and a passenger deck. They can load up to 144 automobiles, using a ramp that is three lanes wide. The ferries can embark 1,500 persons with seating for 1,300.

Construction and career
The Olympic class is the result of the Washington State Department of Transportation requiring replacements for its aging ferry fleet. Funding for a third Olympic-class vessel was authorized in the Spring 2014 session of the Washington State Legislature, and the keel laying and first weld took place on December 9, 2014. The name Chimacum, the gathering place of the Chemakum tribe, was chosen by the Washington State Transportation Commission in November 2014.

She was christened on September 14, 2016 by Lynne Griffith, who at the time was serving as the head of the ferries system, the first woman to hold the office. The ceremony took place at the Vigor Industrial shipyard on Seattle's Harbor Island. She was delivered to Washington State Ferries on April 7, 2017, with her entry into service, replacing , expected in the following months.  The vessel cost $123 million approximately. Chimacum was forced into a three-day early temporary service on May 24 after  suffered a mechanical breakdown and all other vessels were in maintenance until , could replace her on the Seattle–Bremerton run to finish sea trials and training. The vessel entered regular service in June 2017 on the Seattle–Bremerton route. In November 2020, Chimacum was the only ferry servicing the route after emergency repairs were required for fleetmate .

References

External links 
 Washington State Ferries – Chimacum Vessel Details

Ships built in Seattle
Washington State Ferries vessels
2016 ships